The Gillett Baronetcy, of Bassishaw Ward in the City of London, is a title in the Baronetage of the United Kingdom. It was created on 4 December 1959 for Harold Gillett, Lord Mayor of London from 1958 to 1959. His son, the second Baronet, was Lord Mayor of London from 1976 to 1977.

Gillett baronets, of Bassishaw Ward (1959)
Sir (Sydney) Harold Gillett, 1st Baronet (1890–1976)
Sir Robin Danvers Penrose Gillett, 2nd Baronet (1925–2009)
Sir Nicholas Danvers Penrose Gillett, 3rd Baronet (born 1955)

Notes

Gillett